Hremiach is a village in Novhorod-Siverskyi Raion (district) in Chernihiv Oblast of northern Ukraine. The village is the northernmost point of Ukraine. It belongs to Novhorod-Siverskyi urban hromada, one of the hromadas of Ukraine.

References

Novgorod-Seversky Uyezd

Villages in Novhorod-Siverskyi Raion